The Victory Academy (formerly Bishop of Rochester Academy and Medway Community College) is a mixed secondary school and sixth form located in Chatham in the English county of Kent.

History
Bishop of Rochesters Academy was formed in 2010 with the merging of Medway Community College or MCC, with Chatham South. MCC had previously been Fort Luton High School for Boys and Christchurch High School(girls). It changed its name to The Victory Academy when it severed its ties with the Church of England, and was refactored into the Thinking Schools Academy Trust in May 2015

Governance
Medway Community College was a community school directly controlled by Medway Council. The school converted into a Church of England academy in September 2010, and was renamed Bishop of Rochester Academy. The school was sponsored by the Diocese of Rochester, Canterbury Christ Church University and Medway Council. In 2015 the academy changed its name due to severing ties with the Church of England, and is now sponsored by the Thinking Schools Academy Trust.

The building
It is located on Magpie Hall Road, at the crest of dry valley that cuts the chalkland, this constrains the site which still had to host the old school during construction. 
The school was designed by Nicholas Hare Architects using the same construction techniques at Hare's other two Medway buildings: Brompton Academy and Strood Academy.

The Victory Academy is built around a central courtyard with a range of outdoor spaces used for performance and teaching. The building is constructed from prefabricated sections. These include brick-clad pre-cast concrete sandwich panels for external walls, pre-cast columns and pre-cast floor planks.

Curriculum
The Victory Academy offers GCSEs and BTECs as programmes of study for pupils, while students in the sixth form have the option to study from a range of A Levels and further BTECs. The school also operates a grammar school stream for academically gifted pupils.

References

External links

Thinking Schools Trust official website

Secondary schools in Medway
Chatham, Kent
Academies in Medway